Harold Haywood Wilkins (5 March 1916 – 29 December 1999) was the last juvenile to be sentenced to the death penalty in the United Kingdom, on 17 November 1932  at the age of 16 though his sentence was later commuted due to his age. Wilkins was convicted of the "sexually related murder" of Ethel Corey.

The execution of those under the age of 16 had been banned by the Children Act 1908. The age was further raised to 18 in the year after Wilkins' conviction, under the Children and Young Persons Act 1933.

References

Minors convicted of murder
1932 in British law
1932 in the United Kingdom
British prisoners sentenced to death
British people convicted of murder
1916 births
1999 deaths
1932 murders in the United Kingdom